Charles Nathanial Agree (April 18, 1897 – March 10, 1982) was an American architect in Detroit, Michigan.

Biography
Agree moved to Detroit in 1909 at the age of 12. He opened his firm in 1917 after graduating from the Detroit Y.M.C.A. Technical School. His first major commission was in 1921 to build the Whittier Hotel near the bank of the Detroit River. He later went on to design many office buildings, theaters, and ballrooms. Agree was one of the Detroit architects of the 1920s and 1930s who utilized the services of architectural sculptor Corrado Parducci.

As the architecture changed by the 1960s, so did Agree's commissions. He began designing many modern-style malls. In addition to the office in the Book Tower, Agree's firm later opened an office on McNichols Road in Detroit and then a suburban office in Bloomfield Hills.

Several Agree-designed buildings have been plundered by architectural scavengers. These include the Vanity Ballroom, where several Mayan-Deco panels were torn off, and the Grande Ballroom, which brought rock band MC5 into fame, which has sat empty since closing in 1972.

Agree-designed buildings

All buildings are located in Detroit, unless otherwise indicated.

Whittier Hotel, 1921–1927
  The Sovereign Apartments (Buffalo, New York), 1923 (with Lewis and Hill Architects of Buffalo, New York)
  The Stratford Arms (Buffalo, New York), 1924 (with Lewis and Hill Architects of Buffalo, New York)
 Pilgrim and Puritan Apartment Complex, 1924
Belcrest Apartments (previously Belcrest Hotel), 1926
Seville Apartment Hotel, 1926
Hollywood Theater, 1927 (with Graven & Mayger)
Grande Ballroom, 1928
Vanity Ballroom, 1929
Lincoln Theatre, Lincoln Park, Michigan, 1936 (remodeling)
Westown Theater, 1936
Beverly Theatre, 1937
Palmer Park Theatre, 1937
Harpos Concert Theatre, 1939
Royal Theatre, 1940
Trans-Lux Krim, 1941
Showcase Cinemas Dearborn, Dearborn, Michigan, 1941
Duke Theatre, Oak Park, Michigan, named after Duke Ellington, 1941–1947
Park Theatre, Lincoln Park, Michigan, 1942 (remodeling)
Nadell Furs Building, 1944
Woods 6 Theater, Grosse Pointe, Michigan, 1948
Southgate Shopping Center, Southgate, Michigan, 1957
Flint Tavern Hotel, Flint, Michigan
Highland Lodge Apartment Building, Stamford, Connecticut
Detroit Zoo Holden Reptile House, Royal Oak, Michigan
Jewish Community Center, West Bloomfield, Michigan
Oakland Mall, Troy, Michigan 1968
Panama City Mall, Panama City, Florida
Trenton Village Theatre, Trenton, Michigan
Wabeek Building, Birmingham, Michigan (this is credited to Agree, but all records indicate it was designed by Albert Kahn in 1928)
Wilshire Residential Hotel

References

 Charles N. Agree, Buffalo As An Architectural Museum, link

Further reading

1897 births
1982 deaths
People from Bloomfield Hills, Michigan
Artists from Detroit
Architects from Detroit